The Realist was a short lived monthly British magazine first published in March 1929 which brought together many intellectuals from that era.  It was dedicated to Scientific Humanism and carried a distinctive pale orange cover. It closed in January 1930, a victim of the Great Depression.

It was  founded in 1928 by the political scientist George Catlin and Major A. G. Church, then assistant editor of Nature, who became its editor. It was backed by Lord Melchett and published by Macmillan. The literary editor was the then little-known philosopher Gerald Heard.

Contributors included, Arnold Bennett, H. G. Wells, Sir Richard Gregory, J. B. S. Haldane, Bronisław Malinowski, Herbert Read, Julian Huxley, Aldous Huxley, Sir Frank Baines, H. J. Laski and Rebecca West.

Its editorial meetings were held at the London restaurant, Kettners.

The founders hoped to find a market for an intellectual monthly along similar lines to the American Harper's Magazine.

References
 Vera Brittain, autobiography Volume 2 Testament of Experience (1957). Chapter 2 (8).
 The Realist  Catalog entry no. 3412437 at the National Library of Australia. Accessed June 2008.
 Gerald Heard Official Biography by Jay Michael Barrie at the Gerald Heard website. Accessed June 2008.

1929 establishments in the United Kingdom
1930 disestablishments in the United Kingdom
Monthly magazines published in the United Kingdom
Science and technology magazines published in the United Kingdom
Defunct literary magazines published in the United Kingdom
Defunct political magazines published in the United Kingdom
Magazines established in 1929
Magazines disestablished in 1930